Orciatico is a village in Tuscany, central Italy, administratively a frazione of the comune of Lajatico, province of Pisa. At the time of the 2001 census its population was 213.

Orciatico is about 57 km from Pisa and 7 km from Lajatico.

References 

Frazioni of the Province of Pisa